The 2015 All-Ireland Intermediate Hurling Championship was the 32nd staging of the All-Ireland hurling championship for players in the intermediate grade since its establishment by the Gaelic Athletic Association in 1961. The championship began on 26 May 2015 and ended on 8 August 2015.

Cork were the defending champions, however, they were defeated by 0-23 to 0-14 by Galway in the final.

Team summaries

Results

Leinster Intermediate Hurling Championship

Munster Intermediate Hurling Championship

All-Ireland Intermediate Hurling Championship

Statistics

Top scorers
Overall

Single game

Scoring

First goal of the championship
Ian Galvin for Clare against Limerick (Munster quarter-final)
Widest winning margin: 12 points
Galway 1-20 - 0-11 Wexford (Leinster final)
Most goals in a match:  5
Limerick 3-14 - 2-15 Clare (Munster quarter-final)
Most points in a match: 43
Waterford 1-16 - 0-27 Cork (Munster semi-final)
Most goals by one team in a match: 3
Limerick 3-14 - 2-15 Clare (Munster quarter-final)
Galway 3-22 - 1-17 Kilkenny (Leinster semi-final)
 Highest aggregate score: 51
Galway 3-22 - 1-17 Kilkenny (Leinster semi-final)
Most goals scored by a losing team: 2
Clare 2-15 - 3-14 Limerick (Munster quarter-final)
Tipperary 2-13 - 1-23 Limerick (Munster semi-final)

Miscellaneous

 Galway, a team who have faced no competition in their own province for a number of years, enter the Leinster championship for the first time. They later claim their first ever Leinster title.

External links
 2015 Leinster Intermediate Hurling Championship fixtures
 2015 Munster Intermediate Hurling Championship fixtures

References

Intermediate
All-Ireland Intermediate Hurling Championship